
Year 474 (CDLXXIV) was a common year starting on Tuesday (link will display the full calendar) of the Julian calendar. At the time, it was known as the Year of the Consulship of Leo without colleague (or, less frequently, year 1227 Ab urbe condita). The denomination 474 for this year has been used since the early medieval period, when the Anno Domini calendar era became the prevalent method in Europe for naming years.

Events 
 By place 

 Roman Empire 
 January 18 – Emperor Leo I dies of dysentery at Constantinople, after a 17-year reign. He is succeeded by his 7-year-old grandson Leo II, who briefly becomes ruler of the Byzantine Empire.
 February 9 – Zeno, father of Leo II, is crowned as co-emperor (Augustus). He rules the empire together with his son, and stabilises the Eastern frontier. 
 June 24 – Julius Nepos arrives at Portus, and marches on Ravenna. He forces Glycerius to abdicate the throne, and proclaims himself emperor of the Western Roman Empire.
 Glycerius is exiled to Dalmatia (Balkans) and becomes bishop of Salona. Neither the Senate nor the Gallo-Roman aristocracy decide to resist, and Nepos accepts the imperial purple. 
 November 17 – Leo II dies of an unknown disease (possibly poisoned by his mother Ariadne), after a reign of 10 months. Zeno becomes sole Eastern Emperor.
 Winter – Zeno sends an embassy, to conclude a peace with King Genseric. He succeeds in an agreement with the Vandals, to secure the commercial routes in the Mediterranean.

 By topic 

 Art 
 A statue of a Standing Buddha from Sarnath, Uttar Pradesh, (during the Gupta period) is made. It is now kept at the Sarnath Museum in India (source states the creation date as 1st to 2nd century BCE).

Births 
 Abraham of Kratia, Christian monk, saint (approximate date)
 Anthemius of Tralles, Greek architect, mathematician (approximate date)
 Clotilde, Christian wife of Clovis I, ancestress of the succeeding Merovingian kings (Approximate date) (d.545)
 Magnus Felix Ennodius, bishop, Latin poet (approximate date)

Deaths 
 January 18 – Leo I, Byzantine emperor (b. 401)
 November 17 – Leo II, Byzantine emperor (b. 467)
 Theodemir, king of the Ostrogoths (approximate date)

References